This is a list of notable schools in the African country of Lesotho.

 Mabathoana High School

See also

 Education in Lesotho

Schools
Schools
Lesotho
Lesotho

Schools